The 2013 Nantou earthquake struck central Taiwan with a moment magnitude of 5.9 and a maximum Mercalli intensity of V (Moderate) on March 27 at  local time. The epicenter was located in mountainous terrain in Ren'ai Township, Nantou County, Taiwan, not far from Sun Moon Lake.

Damage
News reports indicate that a 72-year-old woman was killed by being crushed by a collapsing wall and 97 people were injured. Most of the injuries were in Taichung. The earthquake caused two fires and stopped five elevators, trapping people inside. This earthquake could be felt in Hong Kong, Fujian, and Zhejiang, China.

Cause
Kuo Kai-wen, director of the ROC Central Weather Bureau Seismological Center (地震測報中心) said on 27 March 2013 that a 100-km long blind fault probably exists at Ren-ai Township in Nantou County.

Reactions

Inside Taiwan
ROC President Ma Ying-jeou visited the Central Emergency Operation Center on 27 March 2013 urging the people to stay alert for any after shock and ready for any emergency situation.

ROC Premier Jiang Yi-huah initiated a cabinet emergency task force to work with the relevant agencies to respond to the earthquake situation. He also urged the relevant government agencies to reassess the safety standard for any local infrastructure buildings.

Outside Taiwan
—ARATS expressed their concern to the earthquake damage and called for continued communication for any new development after the quake.
—Sumio Tarui, representative of Japan's Interchange Association sent his sympathy, expressing his condolences to the deceased and best wishes to the injured.

See also
List of earthquakes in 2013
List of earthquakes in Taiwan

References

2013 03 Nantou
2013 earthquakes
2013 in Taiwan